Abell 2256 is a rich nearby galaxy cluster in the Abell catalogue that exhibits a population of ~ 100 – 200 kpc long steep spectrum synchrotron filaments surrounding the cluster center with significant evidence of merger activity deduced by the presence of two separate X-ray peaks in the X-ray surface brightness distribution. One feature is a radio 'relic'. The other striking feature in the cluster is a long tail whose morphology suggests it is either a one-sided jet or a twin-tail structure. The bending of the tails takes place very near the galaxy core where one might expect little impact from the galaxy's motion through the intergalactic medium, unless the parent galaxy has undergone extreme stripping.

See also
 List of Abell clusters
 Radio relics

References

2256
Ursa Minor (constellation)
Galaxy clusters